Abieta-7,13-diene hydroxylase is an enzyme with systematic name abieta-7,13-diene,NADPH:oxygen oxidoreductase (18-hydroxylating). This enzyme catalyses the following chemical reaction

 abieta-7,13-diene + NADPH + H+ + O2  abieta-7,13-dien-18-ol + NADP+ + H2O

Abietadiene hydroxylase is a heme-thiolate protein (P-450).

References

External links 
 

EC 1.14.13